Speck is a German word for various forms of meat fat, generally for culinary use.

Speck may also refer to:

 Speck (cipher), a family of lightweight block ciphers
 Speck (printing), a manuscript produced with low effort
 Speck (surname), including a list of people with the name
 Speck Products, a maker of cases for consumer electronics
 "Speck" (Space Ghost Coast to Coast), a television episode
 Speck the Altar Boy, a syndicated gag cartoon also known as An Altar Boy Named Speck

See also
 Spec (disambiguation)
 SPEC (disambiguation)